Generalized vaccinia is a cutaneous condition that occurs 6–9 days after vaccination, characterized by a generalized eruption of skin lesions, and caused by the vaccinia virus.

See also 
 Vaccinia
 Skin lesion

References 

Virus-related cutaneous conditions
Vaccinia